Un souvenir ("a memory") is a 1990 novel by the French writer Michel Déon. It tells the story of a French writer who travels to Westcliff-on-Sea in England, where he revisits the locations of his first love which he experienced before World War II.

Adaptation
The book was the basis for a film with the same title directed by Jacques Renard and starring Daniel Prévost and Capucine Delaby. The film was made for France 2 and premiered on 8 July 2009.

References

External links
 Publicity page at the French publisher's website 

1990 French novels
French novels adapted into films
French-language novels
Novels by Michel Déon
Novels set in Essex
Southend-on-Sea (district)
Éditions Gallimard books